In statistical genetics, Haseman–Elston (HE) regression is a form of statistical regression originally proposed for linkage analysis of quantitative traits for sibling pairs. It was first developed by Joseph K. Haseman and Robert C. Elston in 1972. A much earlier source of sib-pair linkage implementation was, in 1935 and 1938, proposed by Lionel S. Penrose, who is father of Nobel laureate theoretical physicist Roger Penrose. In 2000, Elston et al. proposed a "revisited", extended form of Haseman–Elston regression. Since then, further extensions to the "revisited" form of HE regression have been proposed. Although HE regression "...seems a rusty weapon in the genomics analysis armory of the GWAS era. This is because the HE regression relies on relatedness measured on IBD but not identity by state (IBS)...", HE has been adapted for association analysis in unrelated samples, whose relatedness is measured in IBS.

References

Regression analysis
Statistical genetics
Genetic linkage analysis